Kartikeya Kak (born 4 October 1996) is an Indian cricketer. He made his Twenty20 debut on 10 January 2021, for Hyderabad in the 2020–21 Syed Mushtaq Ali Trophy.

References

https://sportstar.thehindu.com/cricket/domestic/maharashtra-vs-hyderabad-ranji-trophy-result-score-highlights-updates-kartikeya-kak-seven-wickets/article66397517.ece/amp/

External links
 

1996 births
Living people
Indian cricketers
Hyderabad cricketers
Place of birth missing (living people)